The American Poetry Museum (APM) is a museum dedicated to American poetry, located in Brookland, Washington, D.C., United States.

The museum was founded in 2004.

As well as a traditional museum role, APM also provides a community meeting place.

References

External links 
 American Poetry Museum website

2004 establishments in Washington, D.C.
American poetry
History museums in Washington, D.C.
Literary museums in the United States
Museums established in 2004
Poetry museums